Christopher Anderson Whyte (born 2 September 1961) is an English former footballer who played as a central defender and made nearly 400 appearances in the Football League and Premier League. He had lengthy spells with Arsenal, West Bromwich Albion, Leeds Unitedwhere he was a pivotal part of their 1991–92 title-winning teamand Birmingham City, and also played for numerous other clubs in England and abroad. Whyte was capped by England at under-21 level.

Club career
Whyte was born in Islington, London, and started his career as a youth player at Arsenal, turning professional in September 1978. A defender who played at centre half (but also less often at full back), he made his Arsenal first-team debut as a substitute against Panathinaikos in the UEFA Cup on 30 September 1981. He made his first appearance in the Football League against Manchester City on 17 October, and went on to start all but one of Arsenal's remaining league matches that season, partnering David O'Leary in central defence. Whyte stood out with his coolness and confidence, as well as his timing and good judgement of the game. The following season, Whyte continued as a regular for Arsenal as the team reached the semi-finals of both domestic cup competitions, and took his tally of England under-21 caps to four.

However, after Arsenal's shock League Cup loss to Walsall in November 1983 and the subsequent dismissal of Terry Neill, Whyte was dropped from the side in favour of new signing Tommy Caton. The emergence of Tony Adams forced Whyte further down the pecking order at Highbury. He made no appearances for Arsenal during 1984–85, instead being loaned out to Crystal Palace, and although he had a brief run as an emergency striker in 1985–86, he was given a free transfer at the end of that season. In all he played 113 matches for Arsenal, scoring eight goals.

No domestic club offered Whyte a contract, and disenchanted, he left for the United States and played for two years in the Major Indoor Soccer League for New York Express and Los Angeles Lazers. In the summer of 1988, Whyte was offered a return to England by Second Division West Bromwich Albion. Whyte made his Albion debut in a League Cup tie against Peterborough United in September 1988, and ended the 1988–89 season as the club's Player of the Year.

Whyte returned to the top flight in 1990, when he was signed for £450,000 by Howard Wilkinson's Leeds United. He was nearly ever-present for the next three seasons, putting in 146 appearances as Leeds won the 1991–92 First Division title. In 1993, he moved to Birmingham City, winning the 1994–95 Second Division title with the Blues. After a brief spell at Coventry City on loan, Whyte left Birmingham in 1996, and subsequently played for Charlton Athletic, Leyton Orient, Oxford United and Rushden & Diamonds.

He then returned to the United States for a spell with the Raleigh Express in the A-League before returning to England to play under former Arsenal teammate Ian Allinson, manager of Harlow Town of Rymans League Division One. In 2000, he played for Finnish third-tier club HyPS.

International career
Whyte was capped four times for the England under-21 team. His first two appearances were in the semi-finals of the 1982 UEFA European Under-21 Championship in April 1982, but he did not play in the final. His third and fourth appearances were later that year, in qualifiers for the next edition of the championships.

Honours

Club
Leeds United
 Football League First Division: 1991–92
 FA Charity Shield: 1992

Birmingham City
 Football League Second Division: 1994–95

Individual
 West Bromwich Albion Player of the Year: 1989

References
Infobox statistics
English Football League clubs: 
New York Express, Los Angeles Lazers: 
Detroit Neon/Safari: 
Rushden & Diamonds: 

General

External links

1961 births
Living people
Footballers from Islington (district)
English footballers
England under-21 international footballers
Association football central defenders
Arsenal F.C. players
Crystal Palace F.C. players
New York Express players
Los Angeles Lazers players
West Bromwich Albion F.C. players
Leeds United F.C. players
West Ham United F.C. players
Birmingham City F.C. players
Coventry City F.C. players
Charlton Athletic F.C. players
Detroit Neon players
Detroit Safari players
Leyton Orient F.C. players
Oxford United F.C. players
Rushden & Diamonds F.C. players
Raleigh Flyers players
Harlow Town F.C. players
Hyvinkään Palloseura players
English Football League players
Major Indoor Soccer League (1978–1992) players
Premier League players
National League (English football) players
Isthmian League players
English expatriate sportspeople in the United States
Expatriate soccer players in the United States
English expatriate footballers